Kaagjärve is a village in Valga Parish, Valga County, in southeastern Estonia, located about 9 km east of the bordertown Valga. As of 2011 Census, the settlement's population was 246.

The currently inactive Valga–Pechory railway passes Kaagjärve on its northern side, there's a station named "Ratsimäe".

Painter Eduard Ole (1898–1995), was born in Kaagjärve.

References

Villages in Valga County
Kreis Werro